Ska2tonics  is a slovak music group from Bratislava playing ska, ska punk and reggae.

About the band
The band was originally formed as a punk group in 1999. However, after some member changes, they decided to do ska.
After some demo records, Ska2tonics released their very first album called Skatastrofa. Some of the demo songs have appeared on the slovak compilations SKA Collection vol. 1 and 2.

Members

Vlado Konček - guitar, lead vocals
Ramon Esteves - bass guitar, vocals
Rasťo Peteraj - guitar
Juraj Lehuta - drums
Katka Sapáková Smyčková - tenor saxophone
Rado Vraník - alt saxophone
Braňo Zervan - alt saxophone
Imrich Kamenár - trombone

Former members
Tomáš Giba - trumpet
Maťo Patka - drums
Tomáš Heretik - guitar
Martin Macek - bass guitar
Roman Kaldrovitsch - bass guitar
Viktor Cotiofan - bass guitar

Discography
2003 - Demo 2003
2004 - EP 2004
2005 - Demo 2005
2006 - Demo 2006
2007 - Skatastrofa (EMI)
2009 - Toto ti zachutí (EMI)
2012 - Ska2tonics

External links
Official site - Ska2tonics
Audio samples - Myspace - Ska2tonics
Videos - Youtube - Ska2tonics

Slovak musical groups